Nathaniel W. Depee (1812 – June 19, 1868) was an American activist, abolitionist, and merchant tailor. He was active in the Underground Railroad, and in Black politics in Philadelphia in the 1830s through 1860s.

Biography 
Nathaniel W. Depee was born in 1812 in Philadelphia, Pennsylvania, U.S.

In 1845, Depee helped to form the Colored American National Society, an organization that helped connect the Colored Conventions Movement and William Whipper's American Moral Reform Society. In 1855, Depee served as a delegate at the 1855 National Colored Convention in Philadelphia.

Depee was one of five members of the acting committee for the Vigilant Association of Philadelphia, others included William Still, Jacob C. White, Passmore Williamson, and Charles Wise. His home at 334 South Street was listed as one of the Underground Railroad stops.

He died on June 19, 1868, in Philadelphia, and was buried initially at Lebanon Cemetery, and later re-interred to Eden Cemetery.

See also 
 History of African Americans in Philadelphia

References 

1812 births
1868 deaths
Underground Railroad people
African-American businesspeople
African-American abolitionists
Burials at Eden Cemetery (Collingdale, Pennsylvania)
Burials at Lebanon Cemetery
Colored Conventions people
People from Philadelphia
African-American upper class
19th-century American businesspeople